Herbertsmithite is a mineral with chemical structure ZnCu3(OH)6Cl2. It is named after the mineralogist Herbert Smith (1872–1953) and was first found in 1972 in Chile. It is polymorphous with kapellasite and closely related to paratacamite. Herbertsmithite is generally found in and around Anarak, Iran, hence its other name, anarakite.

Herbertsmithite is associated with copper mineralizations in syenitic porphyries and granites in Chile and in Triassic dolomite formations in Iran. It has also been reported from the Osborn District in the Big Horn Mountains of Maricopa County, Arizona and the Lavrion District Mines of Attica, Greece.

Herbertsmithite has a vitreous luster and is fairly transparent with a light-green to blue green color. Herbertsmithite has a Mohs hardness of between 3 and 3.5 and is known to have a brittle tenacity. The crystal's density has been calculated at 3.76 g/cm3.

Herbertsmithite, in a pure synthetic form, was discovered in 2012 to be able to exhibit the properties of a quantum spin liquid, a generalized form of  strongly correlated quantum spin liquid due to its Kagome lattice  structure.  Herbertsmithite is the first mineral known to exhibit this unique state of magnetism: it is neither a ferromagnet with mostly aligned magnetic particles, nor is it an antiferromagnet with mostly opposed adjacent magnetic particles; rather its magnetic particles have constantly fluctuating scattered orientations.

Optical conductivity observations  suggest the magnetic state in herbertsmithite is a type of emergent gauge field of a gapless U(1) Dirac spin liquid. Other experiments  and some numerical calculations suggest instead that it is a  spin liquid (or in other words, has a  topological order). To clarify the situation, it is useful to carry out a number of experiments.

References

Copper(II) minerals
Zinc minerals
Halide minerals
Trigonal minerals
Minerals in space group 166
Minerals described in 2003